Leptogyra verrilli is a species of sea snail, a marine gastropod mollusk in the family Melanodrymiidae.

Description

Distribution

References

Melanodrymiidae
Gastropods described in 1897